Bolt thrust or breech pressure is a term used in internal ballistics and firearms (whether small arms or artillery) that describes the amount of rearward force exerted by the propellant gases on the bolt or breech of a firearm action or breech when a projectile is fired. The applied force has both magnitude and direction, making it a vector quantity.

Bolt thrust is an important factor in weapons design. The greater the bolt thrust, the stronger the locking mechanism has to be to withstand it. Assuming equal engineering solutions and material adding strength to a locking mechanism causes an increase in weight and size of locking mechanism components.

Bolt thrust is not a measure to determine the amount of recoil or free recoil.

Calculating bolt thrust
With a basic calculation the bolt thrust produced by a particular firearms cartridge can be calculated fairly accurately.

Formula

 

where:
Fbolt = the amount of bolt thrust
Pmax = the maximum (peak) chamber pressure of the firearms cartridge
Ainternal = the inside area (of the cartridge case head) that the propellant deflagration gas pressure acts against 

Cartridge case heads and chambers are generally circular. The area enclosed by a circle is:

where:
π ≈ 3.1416
r = the radius of the circle

Equivalently, denoting the diameter of the circle by d.

A practical problem regarding this method is that the internal case head diameter of a particular production lot of cartridge cases (different brands and lots normally differ dimensionally) can not be easily measured without damaging them.

Friction effects
A complicating matter regarding bolt thrust is that a cartridge case expands and deforms under high pressure and starts to "stick" to the chamber. This "friction-effect" can be accounted for with finite elements calculations on a computer, but it is a lot of specialized work and generally not worth the trouble.

By oiling proof rounds during NATO EPVAT testing procedures, NATO test centers intentionally lower case friction to promote high bolt thrust levels.

Practical method to estimate bolt thrust
Instead of using the internal case head diameter, the external case head base diameter can also be measured with a caliper or micrometer or taken from the appropriate C.I.P. or SAAMI cartridge or chamber data tables and used for bolt thrust estimation calculations.

The basic calculation method is almost the same, but now the larger outside area of the cartridge case head is used instead of the smaller inside area.

where:
Fbolt = the amount of bolt thrust
Pmax = the maximum (peak) chamber pressure of the firearms cartridge
Aexternal = the outside area of the cartridge case head 

This method is fine for getting a good estimate regarding bolt thrust and assumes an overly large area that the gas pressure acts against yielding pessimistic estimations, generating a safety margin in the process for worse case scenarios which can result in increased maximum (peak) chamber pressure of the firearms cartridge, like a round that is chambered in an already very warm chamber that can result in cooking off (i.e. a thermally induced unintended firing).

Bolt thrust estimations for various pistol/revolver cartridges

The P1 (cartridge case base) diameters and Pmax used in the calculations were taken from the appropriate C.I.P. data sheets.

Bolt thrust estimations for various rifle cartridges

The P1 (cartridge case base) diameters and Pmax used in the calculations were taken from the appropriate C.I.P. data sheets.

References

External links
Blaser R93 Unfälle - zur  Verschlußbelastung 
Zylinderverschluß - Verschlußkräfte 

Firearms
Firearm actions
Firearm terminology
Ammunition